Choe Hang (1409–1474) was a prominent civil minister (called munsin) and scholar who came from the Saknyeong Choe clan during the Joseon Dynasty.

In 1434, the 16th year of Sejong the Great's reign, as he passed gwageo or civil minister exam, with the highest point, he was appointed as the title of Buchucan (副修撰) at Hall of Worthies (Jiphyeonjeon). He participated in helping the king create hangul, Korean alphabet. He also devoted to compiling Dongguk Tonggam and Gyeongguk daejeon (Code of Law).

Family
Father: Choe Sa-yu (최사유, 崔士柔)
Grandfather: Choe Yun-mun (최윤문, 崔潤文)
Grandmother: Lady, of the Hamjong Eo clan (증 정경부인 함종 어씨, 贈 貞敬夫人 咸從 魚氏); daughter of Eo Baek-yu (어백유, 魚伯遊)
Mother: Lady, of the Haeju Oh clan (증 정경부인 해주 오씨, 贈 貞敬夫人 海州 吳氏)
Grandfather: Oh Heok-chung (오혁충, 吳奕忠)
Wife: Lady, of the Dalseong Seo clan (정경부인 달성 서씨, 貞敬夫人 達城 徐氏); daughter of Seo Mi-seong, Internal Prince Dalcheon (서미성 달천부원군, 徐彌性 達川府院君)
1st son: Choe Yeong-rin (최영린, 崔永潾) – remarried again with Lady, of the Goryeong Park clan (숙부인 고령 박씨, 淑夫人 高靈 朴氏); daughter of Park Geon-sun (박건순, 朴健順).
Grandson: Choe Su-yeong (최수영, 崔秀英) – married Lady, of the Seongju Yi clan (숙인 성주 이씨, 淑人 星州 李氏); daughter of Yi Suk-saeng (이숙생, 李叔生)
Great-grandson: Choe Jun-cheol (최준철, 崔濬哲) – married Lady, of the Gwangsan Gim clan (증 숙인 광산 김씨, 贈 淑人 光山 金氏); daughter of Gim-Geo (김거, 金琚).
Great-great-grandson: Choe Gye-jong (최계종, 崔繼宗); adopted, initially the biological son of Choe Gye-hun – married Lady, of the Naju Gim clan (증 숙부인 나주 김씨, 贈 淑夫人 羅州 金氏); daughter of Gim Gyeong-seok (김경석, 金景錫).
Great-grandson: Choe Jun-mun (최준문, 崔濬文) – married Lady, of the Jeonui Yi clan (부인 전의 이씨, 夫人 全義 李氏).
Great-great-grandson: Choe Gye-hun (최계훈, 崔繼勳) – married Lady, of the Andong Gim clan (부인 안동 김씨, 夫人 安東 金氏) and had 2 sons (Choe Gye-jong and Choe Gye-jo).
Great-grandson: Choe Jun-myeong (최준명, 崔濬明) – married Lady, of the Jeonju Yi clan (숙부인 전주 이씨, 淑夫人 全州 李氏); daughter of Yi So-seong (이소성, 李昭城).
Great-great-grandson: Choe Gye-jo (최계조, 崔繼祖); adopted, initially the biological son of Choe Gye-hun – married Lady, of the Jeonju Yi clan (의인 전주 이씨, 宜人 全州 李氏); daughter of Yi Eon-yang (이언양, 李彦陽).
Grandson: Choe Su-ho (최수호, 崔秀豪)
Grandson: Choe Su-ung (최수웅, 崔秀雄) – married Lady, of the Jinju Ha clan (숙인 진주 하씨, 淑人 晉州 河氏); daughter of Ha-Eung (하응, 河應).
Great-grandson: Choe Jun-won (최준원, 崔濬源) – married Lady, of the Sangju Park clan (증 숙부인 상주 박씨, 贈 淑夫人 尙州 朴氏); daughter of Park Gi-su (박기수, 朴期壽).
Great-great-grandson: Choe Eon-su (최언수, 崔彦粹) – married Lady, of the Yeoheung Min clan (정부인 여주 민씨, 貞夫人 驪州 閔氏); daughter of Min-Nyeom (민념, 閔恬).
Great-grandson: Choe Jun-ok (최준옥, 崔濬沃) – had 1 son, Choe-Heon (최헌, 崔憲).
Grandson: Choe Su-geol (최수걸, 崔秀傑) – married Lady, of the Jangyeon No clan (안인 장연 노씨, 安人 長淵 盧氏); daughter of No Su-gang (노수강, 盧守壃).
Unnamed great-grandson
Great-great-grandson: Choe Jun-hyeong (최준형, 崔濬亨) – married Lady, of the Jeonui Yi clan (부인 전의 이씨, 夫人 全義 李氏); daughter of Yi Cheol-su (이철수, 李鐵壽; biological) and Yi Sin-hyo (이신효, 李愼孝; adoptive).
Great-great-grandson: Choe-Dam (최담, 崔曇) – married Lady, of the Wonju Gim clan (부인 원주 김씨, 夫人 原州 金氏); daughter of Gim Yu-in (김유인, 金幼仁).
Great-grandson: Choe Jun-in (최준인, 崔濬仁) – married Lady, of the Pyeongsan Sin clan (숙인 평산 신씨, 淑人 平山 申氏); daughter of Sin Su-rye (신수례, 申守禮).
Great-great-grandson: Choe-Uk (최욱, 崔昱) – remarried again with Lady, of the Hamyeol Namgung clan (의인 함열 남궁씨, 宜人 咸悅 南宮氏); daughter of Namgung Jeo (남궁저, 南宮著) – No issue.
Great-great-grandson: Choe-Seom (최섬, 崔暹) – married Lady, of the Sinpyeong Yi clan (부인 신평 이씨, 夫人 新平 李氏); daughter of Sin Mun-ha (신문하, 新文夏).
Unnamed grandson
2nd son: Choe Yeong-ho (최영호, 崔永灝; 1457–1481) – married Lady, of the Gyeongju Jeong clan (증 정경부인 경주 정씨, 贈 貞敬夫人 慶州 鄭氏); daughter of Jeong Hyo-sang, Prince Gyerim (정효상 계림군, 鄭孝常 鷄林君).
Grandson: Choe Su-eon (최수언, 崔秀彦) – remarried again with Lady, of the Andong Gwon clan (정부인 안동 권씨, 貞夫人 安東 權氏).
Great-grandson: Choe Gyeong-rip (최경립, 崔卿立) – married Lady, of the Gimhae Gim clan (증 숙부인 김해 김씨, 贈 淑夫人 金海 金氏).
Grandson: Choe Su-jin, Internal Prince Yeongcheon (최수진 영천부원군, 崔秀珍 寧川府院君)
Great-grandson: Choe Heung-won, Duke Chungjeong, Internal Prince Yeongpyeong (최흥원 충정공 영평부원군, 崔興源 忠貞公 寧平府院君)
Great-great-grandson: Choe San-rip, Prince Yeongan (최산립 영안군, 崔山立 寧安君) – married Lady, of the Cheongju Han clan (증 정경부인 청주 한씨, 贈 貞敬夫人 淸州 韓氏); daughter of Han-Jin (한진, 韓璡).
Great-great-grandson: Choe Sun-rip (최순립, 崔順立) – married Lady, of the Munhwa Yu clan (증 정부인 문화 유씨, 贈 貞夫人 文化 柳氏); daughter of Yu Dae-chun (유대춘, 柳帶春).

See also 
Hall of Worthies

References

Choe Hang on Encykorea .
Choe Hang on Doosan Encyclopedia .

Joseon scholar-officials
Choe clan of Sangnyeong
1409 births
1474 deaths